Etnies Skatepark of Lake Forest (stylized as etnies Skatepark) is a public skatepark located in Lake Forest, California, United States. The skatepark is owned and operated by the City of Lake Forest. The skatepark provides free identification cards for residents of Lake Forest and Foothill Ranch, while a $15 fee is required for non-residents in exchange for the identification card. Helmets, knee and elbow pads are required for all users. Spectators, with the exception of permitted photographers, are not allowed inside the park.

History

etnies Skatepark of Lake Forest opened on December 13, 2003. The skatepark is a joint venture between the city of Lake Forest and etnies. The park was designed by SITE Design Group, a consulting firm specializing in urban design. The expansion's estimated cost was $632,500 and was expected to be completed by January 2011. The newly expanded park was marked by a ceremony on August 20, 2011, several months behind the expected date.

In August 2010, OC Parenting Magazine named Etnies the best skatepark of the year, its fourth consecutive win.

Etnies skatepark has appeared in video games such as Skate 2.

Events

Events at the skatepark include summer camps, movie screenings, film camps, skateboard camps, overnight camp outs, private lessons and skateboarding classes. The skatepark's programming, fundraising, events, and operations are managed by Scott Stewart. In May 2010, etnies Skatepark of Lake Forest, along with professional skateboarder Ryan Sheckler, hosted a contest in which proceeds went to benefit the Make-A-Wish Foundation. Other participants included Home Depot and the Boy Scouts. The National Scholastic Skating League holds competitions at the park for middle school and high school skateboarding teams.

References

External links
Official website

Skateparks in the United States
Lake Forest, California
Parks in Orange County, California
Municipal parks in California